Lepidium africanum is a species of flowering plant belonging to the family Brassicaceae.

Its native range is Sudan to Southern Africa.

References

africanum
Taxa named by Nicolaas Laurens Burman